SFP may refer to:

Organizations
 Salton Inc. (former stock symbol: SFP), now part of Russell Hobbs, Inc.
 Swedish People's Party of Finland, a Swedish minority and mainly liberal party in Finland
 Syrian Free Press, a Syrian social news network
 Secretariat of the Civil Service (Spanish: Secretaría de la Función Pública), a Mexican cabinet agency

Entertainment
 School Food Punishment, a Japanese band
 Strange Fruit Project, a hip-hop group
 Strong Female Protagonist, an American superhero webcomic

Science and technology
 Science fiction prototyping, the idea of using science fiction to explore future technologies and their social implications
 Seminal fluid protein, a non-sperm component of semen
 Simulated fluorescence process algorithm, a scientific 3D rendering method based on physical light/matter interaction
 Single feature polymorphism, a genetic marker
 Small form-factor pluggable transceiver, a hot-pluggable transceiver for optical fiber
 Enhanced small form-factor pluggable transceiver (SFP+)
 Space flight participant, a person involved in space tourism
 Specific fan power, a function of the volume flow of the fan and the electrical power input
 Spent fuel pool, a storage pool for spent nuclear reactor fuel
 System File Protection, a technology in Microsoft Windows to prevent "DLL hell"

Other uses
 Single Farm Payment, an EU grant scheme
 Science Focus Program, a public magnet high school in Lincoln, Nebraska, US
 Sustainability Facility Professional, a professional credential awarded by the International Facility Management Association